Hum Hindustani (Translation We, the Indians ) is a 1960 Hindi movie produced by  Sashadhar Mukherjee and directed by Ram Mukherjee. The film stars Sunil Dutt, Joy Mukherjee, Asha Parekh, Jagirdar, Helen, Leela Chitnis, Agha, Prem Chopra and Sanjeev Kumar in his debut. The film is a remake of the 1952 Bengali movie Basu Poribar. The film is about  a family who lost everything but didn't leave the path of truth. The music is very good.It has a famous song "Chhodo Kal Ki Baatein" (Let go old stories) sung by Mukesh, with music by Usha Khanna and written by IPTA poet, Prem Dhawan.

The film's music is by Usha Khanna. The film did "above average" business at the box office. Helen said in an interview that she wasn't offered character roles after this film, until later in career and was typecast as a dancer.

Cast
 Sunil Dutt as Sukendra Nath (Suken)
 Joy Mukherjee as Satyendra Nath (Satyen)
 Asha Parekh as Sudha
 Gajanan Jagirdar as Verma
 Helen as Kalpana
 Leela Chitnis as Savitri Nath
 Agha as Anand
 Sanjeev Kumar as Police Inspector
 Hari Shivdasani as Diwan

Plot 
Suken and Satyen are brothers. They were very rich but their father lost everything when his relatives produced fake documents and evidences and took all the properties from him. Suken's marriage with Sudha is cancelled because of their changed fortunes. Satyen's engagement is still intact. Suken works hard and does many things like writing a book titled "Hum Hindustani" which is sold for millions copies, runs an employment agency and participates in stage programs. Satyen works under Mr Verma. One day Mr Verma gives him ten thousand rupees to give to someone. Satyen forgets to lock the almirah and Mr Verma's nephew Shankar steals the money. Meanwhile Suken had gone to pick up Satyen. Satyen is accused of stealing the money and the matter is taken to court. At home, Satyen accuses Suken of stealing and a fist-fight ensues. Suken then  discloses how he has earned all the money. Meanwhile, Anand finds Shankar's diary at the place of the theft and learns about the real thief and gives evidence of the same in court. Shankar tries to foil the brothers' plan to apprehend him and the police arrive in time and arrest him.

Music
 "Neeli Neeli Ghata, O Bhigi Bhigi Hava" - Mukesh, Asha Bhosle
 "Raat Nikhari Hui, Zulf Bikhari Hui" - Mukesh
 "Chhodo kal Ki Baatein, Kal Ki Baat Puraani" - Mukesh
 "Hum Jab Chale To Ye Jahaa Jhume" - Mohammed Rafi
 "Maajhi Meri Qismat Ke Ji Chaahe Jahaan Le Chal" - Lata Mangeshkar
 "Chori Chori Tori Aayi Hai Radha" - Lata Mangeshkar
 "Tu Lage Mora Baalam Ye Kaise Kahu Mai" - Usha Khanna, Geeta Dutt
 "Baalamaa Re Haay, Mori Lat Sulajhaa De" - Asha Bhosle
 "Chhedo Na Mohe Kanha Ja Ja" - Lata Mangeshkar.

This film is also remembered for having introduced Sanjeev Kumar and Prem Chopra.

References

External links 
 
 

1960 films
Hindi remakes of Bengali films
1960s Hindi-language films
Films scored by Usha Khanna
Films directed by Ram Mukherjee